The athletics competition at the 1978 Central American and Caribbean Games was held in Medellín, Colombia.

Medal summary

Men's events

Women's events

Medal table

References

 
 
 

Athletics at the Central American and Caribbean Games
Central American
International athletics competitions hosted by Colombia
1978 Central American and Caribbean Games